Andrée Christensen (born April 16, 1952) is a Franco-Ontarian writer and visual artist.

She was born in Ottawa and studied at Carleton University and Dalhousie University. She taught French as a second language for the Canadian Public Service from 1975 to 1979. After 1979, she worked as an editor for the Canadian national museums.

Christensen published a collection of poetry Le ChQtiment d'Orphee in 1990. She published La Femme sauvage in 1996 and Le Livre des ombres in 1998. In 1999, in collaboration with poet Jacques Flamand, she published Lithochronos ou le premier vol de la pierre in 1999, which was awarded the Trillium Book Award. Also with Jacques Flamand, she published translations in French of poetry by Christopher Levenson, Joe Rosenblatt, Virgil Burnett and Nadine McInnis.

References 

1952 births
Living people
Canadian poets in French
Canadian novelists in French
Franco-Ontarian people
Canadian women novelists
Canadian women poets
20th-century Canadian poets
20th-century Canadian women writers
21st-century Canadian women writers
20th-century Canadian novelists
21st-century Canadian poets
21st-century Canadian novelists